My Daddy, the Crocodile Hunter is a one-hour television documentary film that is hosted by Bindi Irwin and details her life and growing career and also serves as a memorial for her father, famed naturalist and conservationist Steve Irwin, better known as The Crocodile Hunter who died in 2006.  She has inherited his legacy and continues his work.

It was originally broadcast on Friday, 8 June 2007 on Animal Planet. My Daddy, the Crocodile Hunter also served as an introduction to Bindi Irwin and her new TV series, Bindi the Jungle Girl.

See also

List of programs broadcast by Animal Planet

References

External links
 Animal Planet: Irwin Family Weekend

Animal Planet original programming
Television shows set in Australia
2007 in Australian television
Steve Irwin